Howard Gewirtz is an American television producer and writer, whose credits include Taxi, The Larry Sanders Show, Just Shoot Me, Wings, Oliver Beene, Everybody Hates Chris, Gary and Mike and The Simpsons.

Bibliography
The Simpsons
"Homer Defined"

Gary & Mike

"Phish Phry"
"New York, New York"

References

External links
 

American television producers
American television writers
American male television writers
Living people
Place of birth missing (living people)
Year of birth missing (living people)
20th-century American screenwriters
20th-century American male writers
21st-century American screenwriters
21st-century American male writers